M. A. Malek was a former Brigadier General in Bangladesh Army who served as an assistant to the Chief Adviser of the Caretaker government of Bangladesh with the rank of a State Minister.

Early life and education
Malek was born in Barisal, Bangladesh on 4 February 1948. His mother died when he was four-years-old. Malek attended Barisal Zilla School and later enrolled into Bangladesh University of Engineering and Technology (BUET). In April 1972, Malek married Fatema Khatun Neli. Fatema Khatun died on 16 January 2012. The couple had three children: Israt Malek, Tanzil Malek and Tanvir Malek.

Career
Malek was a member of the Mukti Bahini and fought in the Bangladesh Liberation war. He served as the chairman of Bangladesh Power Development Board as the Special Assistant of former Chief Adviser, Fakhruddin Ahmed, to the Caretaker Government. He was head of the Ministry of Social Welfare and the Ministry of Post and Telecommunications.

Death
Malek died on 8 January 2016 in Australia.

References

Bangladesh Army brigadiers
Advisors of Caretaker Government of Bangladesh
2016 deaths